George Milton Rhodes (February 24, 1898 – October 23, 1978) was a Democratic member of the U.S. House of Representatives from Pennsylvania for ten terms from 1949 to 1969.

Early life and career
George M. Rhodes was born in Reading, Pennsylvania. During the First World War he served in the United States Army. He worked as a printer for the Reading Eagle Co. from 1913 to 1927, and business manager for the Reading Labor Advocate from 1927 to 1942. He was an A.F. of L. labor representative. He was editor and manager of the Lancaster New Era from 1942 to 1949.

He was President of Federated Trades Council, A.F. of L. Central Labor Union from 1928 to 1951 and a member of the Reading Housing Authority from 1938 to 1948.

A member of the Socialist Party of Pennsylvania, Rhodes was a delegate to the Socialist National Conventions in 1928 and 1932. He ran for local office several times on the Socialist ticket. After he became a Democrat, he was a delegate to the Democratic National Conventions of 1952 and 1956.

Congress
He was elected as a Democrat to the 81st Congress in 1948, defeating incumbent Republican Congressman Frederick A. Muhlenberg, and re-elected to the nine succeeding Congresses (January 3, 1949 – January 3, 1969). He was not a candidate for reelection in 1968.

As a member of Congress, Rhodes was a supporter of collective bargaining rights. He worked with Senator Olin D. Johnston of South Carolina to introduce the Rhodes-Johnston bill, which would have recognized the collective bargaining rights of all federal workers. This bill never came to a vote due to objections from President Eisenhower, but a limited version of the proposal was later adopted by the administration of President John F. Kennedy in 1961.

Death and legacy
He died in 1978 at the age of 80. The George M. Rhodes Apartments in Reading are named after him.

References

External links

 

1898 births
1978 deaths
Politicians from Reading, Pennsylvania
American Federation of Labor people
American trade union leaders
Socialist Party of America politicians from Pennsylvania
Military personnel from Pennsylvania
United States Army soldiers
Democratic Party members of the United States House of Representatives from Pennsylvania
20th-century American newspaper editors
20th-century American politicians